Hilda Josefina Amalia Anderson Nevárez (10 October 1938 – 5 July 2011) was a Mexican trade union leader and politician from the Institutional Revolutionary Party. She served as Deputy on five legislatures of the Mexican Congress (1964–97; 1970–73; 1982–85; 1988–91 and 2000–03) and as Senator from 1976 to 1982 representing Sinaloa.

References

1938 births
2011 deaths
People from Mazatlán
Politicians from Sinaloa
Women members of the Senate of the Republic (Mexico)
Mexican trade unionists
Members of the Senate of the Republic (Mexico)
Members of the Chamber of Deputies (Mexico)
Institutional Revolutionary Party politicians
21st-century Mexican politicians
21st-century Mexican women politicians
Women members of the Chamber of Deputies (Mexico)
20th-century Mexican politicians
20th-century Mexican women politicians
National Autonomous University of Mexico alumni
Members of the Congress of Mexico City